Stanowo may refer to the following places:
Stanowo, Masovian Voivodeship (east-central Poland)
Stanowo, Pomeranian Voivodeship (north Poland)
Stanowo, Warmian-Masurian Voivodeship (north Poland)